Enter the Dragon is a 1973 martial arts film directed by Robert Clouse, written by Michael Allin, and starring Bruce Lee, John Saxon and Jim Kelly. It was Lee's final completed film appearance before his death on 20 July 1973 at the age of 32. An American and Hong Kong co-production, it premiered in Los Angeles on 19 August 1973, one month after Lee's death. The film is estimated to have grossed over  worldwide (estimated to be the equivalent of over  adjusted for inflation ), against a budget of $850,000. Having earned more than 400 times its budget, it is one of the most profitable films of all time as well as the most successful martial arts film.

Enter the Dragon is widely regarded as one of the greatest martial arts films of all time. In 2004, it was selected for preservation in the United States National Film Registry by the Library of Congress as being "culturally, historically, or aesthetically significant". Among the first films to combine martial arts action with spy film elements and the emerging blaxploitation genre, its success led to a series of similar productions combining the martial arts and blaxploitation genres. Its themes generated scholarly debate about the changes taking place within post-colonial Asian societies following the end of World War II. Enter the Dragon is also considered one of the most influential action films of all time, with its success contributing to mainstream worldwide interest in the martial arts as well as inspiring numerous fictional works, including action films, television shows, action games, comic books, manga and anime.

Plot 
Lee, a highly proficient martial artist and instructor from Hong Kong, is approached by Braithwaite, a British intelligence agent investigating a suspected crime lord named Han. Lee is persuaded to attend a high-profile martial arts tournament on Han's private island to gather evidence that will prove Han's involvement in drug trafficking and prostitution. Shortly before his departure, Lee also learns that the man responsible for his sister's death, O'Hara, is working as Han's bodyguard on the island. Also fighting in the competition are Roper, an indebted gambling addict, and fellow Vietnam War veteran Williams. 

At the end of the first day, Han gives strict orders to the competitors not to leave their rooms. Lee makes contact with covert operative Mei Ling and sneaks into Han's underground compound, looking for evidence. He is discovered by several guards, but manages to escape. The next morning, Han orders his giant enforcer Bolo to kill the guards in public for failing in their duties. After the execution, the competition resumes with Lee facing O'Hara. Lee beats O'Hara in humiliating fashion, then kills him after he attacks Lee with a pair of broken bottles. Han abruptly ends the day's competition after stating that O'Hara's treachery has disgraced them. Han confronts Williams, who had also left his room the previous night to exercise. 

Han believes Williams to have knowledge of the intruder and after a destructive brawl, beats Williams to death with his iron prosthetic hand. Han then reveals his drug operation to Roper, hoping that he will join his organisation. Han also implicitly threatens to imprison Roper, along with all the other martial artists who joined Han's tournaments in the past, if Roper will not join his operation. Despite being initially intrigued, Roper refuses after learning of Williams's fate. Lee sneaks out again that night and manages to send a message to Braithwaite, but he is captured after a prolonged battle with the guards. The next morning, Han arranges for Roper to fight Lee, but Roper refuses. As a punishment, Roper has to fight Bolo instead, whom he manages to overpower and beat after a grueling battle. 

Enraged by the unexpected failure, Han commands his remaining men to kill Lee and Roper. Facing insurmountable odds, they are soon aided by the island's prisoners and the other invited martial artists, who had been freed by Mei Ling. Han escapes and is pursued by Lee, who finally corners him in his museum. After a brutal fight, Han runs away into a hidden mirror room. The mirrors initially give Han an advantage, but Lee smashes all the room's mirrors to reveal Han's location and eventually kills him. Lee returns outside to the main battle, which is now over. Bruised and bloodied, Lee and Roper exchange a weary thumbs-up as the military finally arrives to take control of the island.

Cast 
 Bruce Lee as Lee, a martial artist who instructs pupils at the Shaolin Temple. He is given an assignment to infiltrate Han's island.
 John Saxon as Roper, a martial artist and gambling addict who is invited to Han's island.
 Jim Kelly as Williams, a martial artist who is invited to Han's island. He and Roper were fellow veterans that served in the Vietnam War. This was Kelly's breakout role.
 Ahna Capri as Tania, Han's secretary who coordinates the ladies on Han's island.
 Shih Kien as Han (voice dubbed by Keye Luke), a crime lord and renegade Shaolin monk who organizes a martial arts tournament with hopes of recruiting talent to his underground drug operations. He has an artificial left hand that he can attach various weapons, including a claw and a set of blades. 
 Bob Wall as O'Hara, Han's bodyguard, noted for a facial scar over his left eye. He was responsible for the attack on Lee's family and sister.  Wall previously appeared as a different character in Way of the Dragon and would later appear as a third character in Game of Death.
 Angela Mao Ying as Su Lin, Lee's sister.
 Betty Chung as Mei Ling, an operative who is working undercover as one of Han's ladies.
 Geoffrey Weeks as Braithwaite, a British Intelligence agent who briefs Lee on the mission.
 Yang Sze as Bolo, Han's enforcer.
 Peter Archer as Parsons, an arrogant New Zealand martial artist who is invited to Han's island.

 Jackie Chan (uncredited) as a minor henchman.

Production 
Due to the success of his earlier films, Warner Bros began helping Bruce Lee with the film in 1972. They brought in producers Fred Weintraub and Paul Heller. The film was produced on a tight production budget of $850,000. Fighting sequences were staged by Bruce Lee.

Writing 
The screenplay title was originally named Blood and Steel. The story features Asian, White and Black heroic protagonists because the producers wanted a film that would appeal to the widest possible international audiences.
The scene in which Lee states that his style is "Fighting Without Fighting" is based upon a famous anecdote involving the 16th century samurai Tsukahara Bokuden.

Casting 
Rod Taylor was first choice for playing the down-on-his-luck martial artist Roper. Director Robert Clouse had already worked with Taylor in the 1970 film Darker than Amber. However, Taylor was dropped after Bruce Lee deemed him to be too tall for the role. 
John Saxon, who was a black belt in Judo and Shotokan Karate (he studied under grandmaster Hidetaka Nishiyama for three years), became the preferred choice. During contractual negotiations, Saxon's agent told the film's producers that if they wanted him they would have to change the plot so that the character of Williams is killed instead of Roper. They agreed and the script was changed. In a six decade career, the character would become one of Saxon's best known roles.

Rockne Tarkington was originally cast in the role of Williams. However, he unexpectedly dropped out days before the production was about to begin in Hong Kong. Producer Fred Weintraub knew that karate world champion Jim Kelly had a training dojo in Crenshaw, Los Angeles, so he hastily arranged a meeting. Weintraub was immediately impressed, and Kelly was cast in the film. The success of Kelly's appearance launched his career as a star: after Enter the Dragon, he signed a three-film deal with Warner Bros and went on to make several martial arts-themed blaxploitation films in the 1970s.

Jackie Chan has uncredited roles as various guards during the fights with Lee. However, Yuen Wah was Lee's main stunt double for the film, responsible for the gymnastics stunts such as the cartwheels and jumping back flip in the opening fight.

Sammo Hung also has an uncredited role in the opening fight scene against Lee at the start of the film.

A rumor surrounding the making of Enter The Dragon claims that actor Bob Wall did not like Bruce Lee and that their fight scenes were not choreographed. However, Wall has denied this, stating he and Lee were good friends.

Filming 
The film was shot on location in Hong Kong. In keeping with local film-making practices, scenes were filmed without sound: dialogue and sound effects were added or dubbed in during post-production. Bruce Lee, after he had been goaded or challenged, fought several real fights with the film's extras and some set intruders during filming. The scenes on Han's Island were filmed at a residence known as Palm Villa near the coastal town of Stanley. The villa is now demolished and the area heavily redeveloped around Tai Tam Bay where the martial artists were filmed coming ashore.

Soundtrack 

Argentinian musician Lalo Schifrin composed the film's musical score. While Schifrin was widely known at the time for his jazz scores, he also incorporated funk and traditional film score elements into the film's soundtrack. He composed the score by sampling sounds from China, Korea, and Japan. The soundtrack has sold over 500,000 copies, earning a gold record.

Release

Marketing 
Enter the Dragon was heavily advertised in the United States before its release. It was unlike any promotional campaign that had been seen before, and was extremely comprehensive. To advertise the film, the studio offered free Karate classes, produced thousands of illustrated flip books, comic books, posters, photographs, and organised dozens of news releases, interviews, and public appearances for the stars. Esquire, The Wall Street Journal, Time, and Newsweek all wrote stories on the film.

Box office 
Enter the Dragon was one of the most successful films of 1973. Upon release in Hong Kong, the film grossed , which was huge business for the time, but less than Lee's previous 1972 films Fist of Fury and The Way of the Dragon.

Upon its expansion the following week, it topped the charts for two weeks. Over the next four weeks, it remained in the top 10 while competing with other kung fu films, including Lady Kung Fu, The Shanghai Killers and Deadly China Doll which held the top spot for one week each. 

In October, Enter the Dragon regained the top spot in its eighth week. It sold  tickets and grossed  from its initial US release, making it the year's fourth highest-grossing film in the market. It was repeatedly re-released throughout the 1970s, with each re-release entering the top five in the box office charts.

In Europe, the film initially monopolized several London West End cinemas for five weeks, before becoming a sellout success across Britain and the rest of Europe. In Spain, it was the seventh top-grossing film of 1973, selling 2,462,489 tickets. In Germany, it was one of the top 10 highest-grossing films of 1974, with  ticket sales. In Greece, the film earned  in its first year of release.

In South Korea, the film sold 229,681 tickets in the capital city of Seoul. In India, the movie was released in 1975 and opened to full houses; in one Bombay theater, New Excelsior, it had a packed 32-week run. The film was also a success in Iran, where there was a theater which played it daily up until the 1979 Iranian Revolution.

Against a tight budget of $850,000, the film grossed  upon its initial 1973 worldwide release, making it one of the world's highest-grossing films of all time up until then. The film went on to have multiple re-releases around the world over the next several decades, significantly increasing its worldwide gross. The film went on to gross over  internationally by 1981, making it the highest-grossing martial arts film of all time. It was reportedly still among the  all-time highest-grossing films in 1990. 

By 1998, it had grossed more than  worldwide. , it has grossed an estimated total of over  worldwide, having earned more than 400 times its original budget. The film's cost-to-profit ratio makes it one of the most commercially successful and profitable films of all time.

Critical reception 
Upon release, the film initially received mixed reviews from several critics, including a favorable review from Variety magazine. The film eventually went on to be well-received by most critics, and it is widely regarded as one of the best films of 1973. Critics have referred to Enter the Dragon as "a low-rent James Bond thriller", a "remake of Dr. No" with elements of Fu Manchu. J.C. Maçek III of PopMatters wrote, "Of course the real showcase here is the obvious star here, Bruce Lee, whose performance as an actor and a fighter are the most enhanced by the perfect sound and video transfer. While Kelly was a famous martial artist and a surprisingly good actor and Saxon was a famous actor and a surprisingly good martial artist, Lee proves to be a master of both fields."

Many acclaimed newspapers and magazines reviewed the film. Variety described it as "rich in the atmosphere", the music score as "a strong asset" and the photography as "interesting". The New York Times gave the film a rave review: "The picture is expertly made and well-meshed; it moves like lightning and brims with color. It is also the most savagely murderous and numbing hand-hacker (not a gun in it) you will ever see anywhere."

The film holds a 95% approval rating on the review aggregation website Rotten Tomatoes based on 55 reviews, with an average rating of 7.80/10. The site's critical consensus reads, "Badass to the max, Enter the Dragon is the ultimate kung-fu movie and fitting (if untimely) Bruce Lee swan song."  On Metacritic it has a weighted average score of 83% based on reviews from 16 critics, indicating "universal acclaim". In 2004, the film was deemed "culturally significant" by the Library of Congress and selected for preservation in the National Film Registry.

Enter the Dragon was selected as the best martial arts film of all time, in a 2013 poll of The Guardian and The Observer critics. The film also ranks No. 474 on Empire magazine's 2008 list of The 500 Greatest Movies of All Time.

Home video 
Enter the Dragon has remained one of the most popular martial arts films since its premiere and has been released numerous times worldwide on multiple home video formats. For almost three decades, many theatrical and home video versions were censored for violence, especially in the West. In the U.K. alone, at least four different versions have been released. Since 2001, the film has been released uncut in the U.K. and most other territories. Most DVDs and Blu-rays come with a wide range of extra features in the form of documentaries, interviews, etc. In 2013, a second, remastered HD transfer appeared on Blu-ray, billed as the "40th Anniversary Edition". 

In 2020, new 2K digital restorations of the theatrical cut and special edition were included as part of the Bruce Lee: His Greatest Hits box set by The Criterion Collection (under licensed from Warner Bros. Home Entertainment through the physical home media joint venture in US and Canada named Studio Distribution Services, LLC. and Fortune Star Media Limited), which featured all of Lee's films, as well as Game of Death II.

Legacy 
The film has been parodied and referenced in places such as the 1976 film The Pink Panther Strikes Again, the satirical publication The Onion, the Japanese game-show Takeshi's Castle, and the 1977 John Landis comedy anthology film Kentucky Fried Movie (in its lengthy "A Fistful of Yen" sequence, basically a comedic, note for note remake of Dragon) and also in the film Balls of Fury. It was also parodied on television in That '70s Show during the episode "Jackie Moves On" with regular character Fez taking on the Bruce Lee role. Several clips from the film are comically used during the theatre scene in The Last Dragon.

Lee's martial arts films were broadly lampooned in the recurring Almost Live! sketch Mind Your Manners with Billy Quan.

In August 2007, the now-defunct Warner Independent Pictures announced that television producer Kurt Sutter would be remaking the film as a noir-style thriller entitled Awaken the Dragon with Korean singer-actor Rain starring. It was announced in September 2014 that Spike Lee would work on the remake. In March 2015, Brett Ratner revealed that he wanted to make the remake. In July 2018, David Leitch is in early talks to direct the remake.

Cultural impact 
Enter the Dragon has been cited as one of the most influential action films of all time. Sascha Matuszak of Vice called it the most influential kung fu film and said it "is referenced in all manner of media, the plot line and characters continue to influence storytellers today, and the impact was particularly felt in the revolutionizing way the film portrayed African-Americans, Asians and traditional martial arts." Joel Stice of Uproxx called it "arguably the most influential Kung Fu movie of all time." Kuan-Hsing Chen and Beng Huat Chua cited its fight scenes as influential as well as its "hybrid form and its mode of address" which pitches "an elemental story of good against evil in such a spectacle-saturated way". Hollywood filmmaker Quentin Tarantino cited Enter the Dragon as a formative influence on his career.

According to Scott Mendelson of Forbes, Enter the Dragon contains spy film elements similar to the James Bond franchise. Enter the Dragon was the most successful action-spy film to not be part of the James Bond franchise; Enter the Dragon had an initial global box office comparable to the James Bond films of that era, and a lifetime gross surpassing every James Bond film up until GoldenEye (1995). Mendelson argues that, had Lee lived after Enter the Dragon was released, the film had the potential to launch an action-spy film franchise starring Lee that could have rivalled the success of the James Bond franchise.

The film had an impact on mixed martial arts (MMA). In the opening fight sequence, where Lee fights Sammo Hung, Lee demonstrated elements of what would later become known as MMA. Both fighters wore what would later become common mixed martial arts clothing items, including kempo gloves and small shorts, and the fight ends with Lee utilizing an armbar (then used in judo and jiu jitsu) to submit Hung. According to UFC Hall of Fame fighter Urijah Faber, "that was the moment" that MMA was born.

The Dragon Ball manga and anime franchise, debuted in 1984, was inspired by Enter the Dragon, which Dragon Ball creator Akira Toriyama was a fan of. The title Dragon Ball was also inspired by Enter the Dragon, and the piercing eyes of Goku's Super Saiyan transformation was based on Bruce Lee's paralysing glare.

Enter the Dragon inspired early beat 'em up brawler games. It was cited by game designer Yoshihisa Kishimoto as a key inspiration behind Technōs Japan's brawler Nekketsu Kōha Kunio-kun (1986), released as Renegade in the West. Its spiritual successor Double Dragon (1987) also drew inspiration from Enter the Dragon, with the game's title being a homage to the film. Double Dragon also features two enemies named Roper and Williams, a reference to the two characters Roper and Williams from Enter the Dragon. The sequel Double Dragon II: The Revenge (1988) includes opponents named Bolo and Oharra.

Enter the Dragon was the foundation for fighting games. The film's tournament plot inspired numerous fighting games. The Street Fighter video game franchise, debuted in 1987, was inspired by Enter the Dragon, with the gameplay centered around an international fighting tournament, and each character having a unique combination of ethnicity, nationality and fighting style. Street Fighter went on to set the template for all fighting games that followed. The little-known 1985 Nintendo arcade game Arm Wrestling contains voice leftovers from the film, as well as their original counterparts. The popular fighting game Mortal Kombat borrows multiple plot elements from Enter the Dragon, as does its movie adaptation.

See also 
 Bruce Lee filmography

Notes

References

External links 

 Enter the Dragon essay by Michael Sragow at National Film Registry 
 Enter the Dragon essay by Daniel Eagan in America's Film Legacy: The Authoritative Guide to the Landmark Movies in the National Film Registry, A&C Black, 2010 , pages 694-696 
 
 
 
 

1973 films
1973 martial arts films
1970s spy action films
1973 multilingual films
1970s American films
American films about revenge
American martial arts films
American multilingual films
Concord Production Inc. films
English-language Hong Kong films
Films about the illegal drug trade
Films directed by Robert Clouse
Films scored by Lalo Schifrin
Films set in Hong Kong
Films shot in Hong Kong
Films set in Los Angeles
Films set on islands
Hong Kong films about revenge
Hong Kong martial arts films
Hong Kong multilingual films
Jeet Kune Do films
Karate films
Kung fu films
Martial arts tournament films
Shaolin Temple in film
United States National Film Registry films
Warner Bros. films
1970s English-language films
1970s Hong Kong films